The 2006 Buffalo Funds - NAIA Men's Division I  Basketball Tournament was held from March 15 to 21 at Municipal Auditorium in Kansas City, Missouri. This was the 69th annual NAIA Division I basketball tournament and featured 32 teams playing in a single-elimination format.

The unranked Texas Wesleyan University Rams defeated the Oklahoma City University Stars by a score of 67 to 65. 2006 marked the second year in a row an unranked team won the National Championship. Undeterred by this loss, the Stars went on to win the next two National Championship titles. The other teams that made it to the NAIA National Semifinals were Oklahoma Baptist University and Robert Morris (IL).

Awards and honors
Leading scorer: Willie Irick, Oklahoma City; in 5 games Irick scored a total of 85 points, including 31 field goals and 17 free throws averaging 17.0 points per game.
Leading rebounder: Freeman Taylor, Robert Morris (IL); in 4 games Taylor earned 61 rebounds averaging 15.25 per game
Most consecutive tournament appearances: 15th, Georgetown (KY)
Most tournament appearances: Georgetown (KY), 25th of 30, appearances to the NAIA Tournament.

Bracket

See also
2006 NAIA Division I women's basketball tournament
2006 NCAA Division I men's basketball tournament
2006 NCAA Division II men's basketball tournament
2006 NCAA Division III men's basketball tournament
2006 NAIA Division II men's basketball tournament

References

NAIA Men's Basketball Championship
Tournament
NAIA Division I men's basketball tournament
NAIA Division I men's basketball tournament